A list of British films released in 1940.

1940

See also
 1940 in British music
 1940 in British television
 1940 in the United Kingdom

References

External links
 

1940
Films
British
1940s in British cinema